Laem Ngop is a district (amphoe) of Trat province, eastern Thailand.

History
The district was established in 1897 named Ko Chang District. The district office was in Ban Dan Kao on Ko Chang. The district controlled all islands in Trat Province. As the district office was on an island, it was not convenient for most of people on mainland, thus the government moved the office to Ban Laem Ngop, but kept the district name. In 1939 the district name was changed in accordance with the location of the district office.

Geography
Neighboring districts are (from the north clockwise) Khlung of Chanthaburi province, Khao Saming, Mueang Trat of Trat Province and the Gulf of Thailand.

Administration
The district is divided into four sub-districts (tambons), which are further subdivided into 25 villages (mubans). There are two townships (thesaban tambon): Laem Ngop covers parts of the tambon Laem Ngop, and Nam Chiao the complete tambon Nam Chiao. There are a further three tambon administrative organizations (TAO).

Missing numbers now for the districts Ko Kut and Ko Chang.

References

External links
amphoe.com

Laem Ngop